Ozone is a locale in Bonneville County, Idaho, United States. It is located on Bone Road in eastern Idaho.

In 1946, 26 people were registered to vote in the Ozone precinct.

References

Former populated places in Idaho
Ghost towns in Idaho